The Pacific Journal of Mathematics is a mathematics research journal supported by several universities and research institutes, and currently published on their behalf by Mathematical Sciences Publishers, a non-profit academic publishing organisation, and the University of California, Berkeley.

It was founded in 1951 by František Wolf and Edwin F. Beckenbach and has been published continuously since, with five two-issue volumes per year and 12 issues per year. Full-text PDF versions of all journal articles are available on-line via the journal's website with a subscription.

The journal is incorporated as a 501(c)(3) organization.

References 

Mathematics journals
Publications established in 1951
Mathematical Sciences Publishers academic journals